The 1962 Hardin–Simmons Cowboys football team was an American football team that represented Hardin–Simmons University as an independent during the 1962 NCAA University Division football season. In its first and only season under head coach Jack Thomas, the team compiled a 1–9 record and was outscored by a total of 206 to 72.

Schedule

References

Hardin-Simmons
Hardin–Simmons Cowboys football seasons
Hardin-Simmons Cowboys football